The 1967 Indian general election in Jammu and Kashmir to the 4th Lok Sabha were held for 6 seats. Indian National Congress won 5 seats and Jammu & Kashmir National Conference won Srinagar constituency.  It was the first direct election when the MPs from J&K were sent to Lok Sabha. The polling percentage was 53.42%.

Constituency Details

Results

Party-wise Results

List of Elected MPs

See also 

 Elections in Jammu and Kashmir

References 

1967
1967
Jammu